= Embedded generosity =

Embedded generosity is the incorporation of charitable donations into the sale of a product at no extra cost and was highlighted as a key consumer trend for 2010 by Trendwatching. Consumers are increasingly trying to do good as they spend. Research in 2008 by Cone, a brand consultancy, found that 79% of consumers would switch to a brand associated with a good cause.

Rather than try to make products that can be marketed as ethical in their own right, such as "fair trade" goods, firms are increasingly trying to take an ordinary product and boost its moral credentials with embedded generosity

== Examples ==
Examples of embedded generosity initiatives include:

- IKEA promised to donate a solar powered desk lamp to UNICEF for every unit sold in IKEA stores worldwide, to give to children without electricity in refugee camps and villages in remote areas
- In October 2009, Twitter's owners announced that they will begin selling wine through their Fledgling Wine label. The wine will be bottled from August 2010 and US$5 of every bottle sold will go to Room to Read, a charity that organizes literacy programs for children around the world.
- fairsharemusic launched an online music store which combines charitable donations with music downloads. It promises to give half of the profit (equating to 32p for an album costing £7.99)
- Sharwoods launched a limited edition chutney with the support of Joanna Lumley. Ten pence from each jar sold will go to the Gurkha Welfare Trust
